The 2013–14 season is Wofoo Tai Po's 3rd season in the Hong Kong Second Division League, as well as the 11th season in the Hong Kong football. This season is also Wofoo Tai Po's first season after their relegation from the top-tier division in the 2012–13 season. Wofoo Tai Po will compete in the Second Division League and Junior Challenge Shield in this season.

Key events
 9 May 2013: The club confirmed that head coach Cheung Po Chun leaves the club after spending four seasons with them.
 30 May 2013: Hong Kong midfielder To Hon To leaves the club and joins First Division club Kitchee for free.
 31 May 2013: Brazilian midfielder Aender Naves Mesquita leaves the club and joins First Division club South China for free.
 1 June 2013: Chinese-born Hong Kong midfielder Jing Teng leaves the club and joins First Division club Sunray Cave JC Sun Hei for free.
 2 June 2013: Hong Kong goalkeeper Li Hon Ho leaves the club and joins newly promoted First Division club Eastern Salon for free.
 2 June 2013: Brazilian defender Clayton Michel Afonso leaves the club and joins newly promoted First Division club Eastern Salon for free.
 7 June 2013: Hong Kong defender Li Shu Yeung leaves the club and joins First Division club Yokohama FC Hong Kong for free.
 8 June 2013: Hong Kong goalkeeper Pang Tsz Kin leaves the club and joins newly promoted First Division club Happy Valley for free.
 8 June 2013: Hong Kong midfielder Wong Yim Kwan leaves the club and joins newly promoted First Division club Happy Valley for free.
 9 June 2013: Nigerian striker Alex Tayo Akande leaves the club and joins First Division club Kitchee for free.
 9 June 2013: Ghanaian striker Christian Annan leaves the club and joins First Division club Kitchee for free.
 21 June 2013: Chinese-born Hong Kong midfielder Che Runqiu leaves the club and joins First Division club Southern for free.

Players

Squad information

Last update: 31 July 2013
Source: Tai Po FC
Ordered by squad number.
LPLocal player; FPForeign player; NRNon-registered player

Transfers

In

Out

Loan In

Loan out

Squad statistics

Overall Stats
{|class="wikitable" style="text-align: center;"
|-
!width="100"|
!width="60"|Second Division
!width="60"|Junior Shield
!width="60"|Total Stats
|-
|align=left|Games played    ||  0  ||  0  || 0
|-
|align=left|Games won       ||  0  ||  0  || 0
|-
|align=left|Games drawn     ||  0  ||  0  || 0
|-
|align=left|Games lost      ||  0  ||  0  || 0
|-
|align=left|Goals for       ||  0  ||  0  || 0
|-
|align=left|Goals against   ||  0  ||  0  || 0
|- =
|align=left|Players used    ||  0  ||  0  || 01
|-
|align=left|Yellow cards    ||  0  ||  0  || 0
|-
|align=left|Red cards       ||  0  ||  0  || 0
|-

Players Used: Wofoo Tai Po have used a total of 0 different players in all competitions.

Top scorers

Disciplinary record

Starting 11
This will show the most used players in each position, based on Wofoo Tai Po's typical starting formation once the season commences.

Captains

Competitions

Overall

Second Division League

Classification

Results summary

Results by round

Matches

Pre-season friendlies

References

Tai Po FC seasons
Tai